KCK is a popular name of Kansas City, Kansas, to differentiate it from Kansas City, Missouri.

KCK may also refer to:

Transport 
 Fairfax Municipal Airport, Kansas City, Kansas; defunct
 Kirensk Airport, Irkutsk Oblast, Russia
 Knockholt railway station, London, England

Other uses 
 Kalanga language
 Karthik Calling Karthik, a 2010 Hindi-language film
 Kilkenny College, Kilkenny, Ireland
 Kingswood College, Kandy, Sri Lanka
 Kurdistan Communities Union,, a Kurdish political organization